The 1989 Tour de Romandie was the 43rd edition of the Tour de Romandie cycle race and was held from 9 May to 14 May 1989. The race started in Plan-les-Ouates and finished in Geneva. The race was won by Phil Anderson of the TVM team.

General classification

References

1989
Tour de Romandie